Conor Gleeson may refer to:
 Conor Gleeson (Tipperary hurler) (born 1973), Irish hurler
 Conor Gleeson (Waterford hurler), Irish hurler

See also
 Connor Gleeson, Gaelic footballer for Galway